Liparis coelogynoides, commonly known as the fairy sphinx orchid, is a plant in the orchid family and is endemic to near-coastal eastern Australia. It is an epiphytic orchid with two leaves joined at the base and that grows in clumps. Greenish white or yellowish flowers are borne on an often hanging spike. It grows on trees and cliff faces usually on ranges near the coast of northern New South Wales and southern Queensland.

Description
Flowering occurs between November and March.

Taxonomy and naming
The fairy sphinx orchid was first formally described in 1860 by Ferdinand von Mueller who gave it the name Sturmia coelogynoides and published the description in Fragmenta phytographiae Australiae. The description was based on a collection made by Ludwig Becker near the headwaters of the Clarence River. In 1873, George Bentham changed the name to Liparis coelogynoides and published the change in Flora Australiensis. The specific epithet (coelogynoides) refers to the similarity of this species to orchids in the genus Coelogyne - the ending -oides is a Latin suffix meaning "like", "resembling" or "having the form of".

Distribution and habitat
Liparis coelogynoides is widespread and common, growing on trees and rocky escarpments in rainforest between the Bunya Mountains in Queensland and the Hunter River in New South Wales.

References 

coelogynoides
Orchids of New South Wales
Orchids of Queensland
Plants described in 1860
Taxa named by Ferdinand von Mueller